Ptilopsaltis is a genus of moths in the family Acrolophidae.

Species
Ptilopsaltis santarosae
Ptilopsaltis synchorista

References

Acrolophidae
Taxa named by Edward Meyrick
Moth genera